Jean-Claude Rouget (born 1953 in Normandy) is a French Thoroughbred horse trainer and former jockey.

References

1953 births
Living people
French jockeys
People from Lisieux
French horse trainers
Sportspeople from Calvados (department)